The Pashleth Glacier is a glacier south of the Machmell River and west of the Klinaklini Glacier in southwestern British Columbia, Canada.

References

Glaciers of the Pacific Ranges
Central Coast of British Columbia